Azucena Villaflor (7 April 1924 – 10 December 1977) was an Argentine activist and one of the founders of the human rights association Mothers of the Plaza de Mayo, which looked for desaparecidos (victims of forced disappearance during Argentina's Dirty War).

Life and family
Villaflor was the daughter of a lower class family, and her mother, Emma Nitz, was only 15 years old when Azucena was born; her father, Florentino Villaflor, was 21 and worked in a wool factory. Villaflor's paternal family had a history of militant involvement in Peronism.

Azucena started working at age 16 as a telephone secretary in a home appliances company. There she met Pedro De Vincenti, a labor union delegate. She married De Vicenti in 1949, and they had four children.

Mothers of the Plaza de Mayo
On 30 November 1976, eight months after the beginning of the military dictatorship that had named itself "National Reorganization Process", one of Villaflor's sons, Néstor, was abducted together with his girlfriend Raquel Mangin. Villaflor started searching for them through the Ministry of Interior and sought support from the military vicar Adolfo Tortolo (though they could only speak with his secretary, Emilio Grasselli). During this search, she met other women also looking for missing relatives.

After six months of fruitless inquiry, Villaflor decided to start a series of demonstrations in order to take her case public. On 30 April 1977, she and thirteen other mothers, including María Adela Gard de Antokoletz, went to Plaza de Mayo in central Buenos Aires, in front of the Casa Rosada government palace, chosen by Villaflor because it was a politically significant spot in the history of Argentina. They decided to march around the Plaza, since the police had ordered them to "circulate", in the sense of not staying. The first march was on a Saturday, and not very visible; the second one took place on a Friday, and from then on, they settled on Thursdays, at about 3:30 p.m. (this schedule is still kept at present).

Disappearance and death

That same year, on 10 December, (International Human Rights Day), the Mothers published a newspaper advertisement with the names of their "disappeared" children. That night, Azucena Villaflor was taken by armed force from her home in Villa Dominico, Avellaneda, Buenos Aires. She is reported to have been detained in the concentration camp of the Navy Mechanics School (ESMA), which was run by Alfredo Astiz at that time.

It was not until 2003 that exhumations by the Argentine Forensic Anthropology Team (Equipo Argentino de Antropología Forense, EAAF, known also for having found and identified Che Guevara's corpse in Bolivia) identified the bodies of five women who had disappeared in 1977: Villaflor, Esther Ballestrino, María Ponce de Bianco, Angela Auad, and Sister Léonie Duquet. The bodies showed fractures consistent with a fall and impact against a solid surface, which confirmed the hypothesis that the prisoners had been taken in one of the many "death flights" (vuelos de la muerte) recounted by former naval officer Adolfo Scilingo. In these flights, prisoners were drugged, stripped naked and flung out of aircraft flying over the ocean.

Villaflor's remains were cremated and her ashes were buried at the foot of the May Pyramid in the center of the Plaza de Mayo, on 8 December 2005, at the end of the 25th Annual Resistance March of the Mothers. Her surviving children chose the place; her daughter Cecilia said it was because "Here [at the Plaza] is where my mother was born to public life and here she must stay forever. She must stay for everyone".

A biography of Azucena Villaflor was written by historian Enrique Arrosagaray in 1997 and there is a street with her name.

Further reading

References

External links
 Argentine Forensic Anthropology Team
 Remains of Mothers of Plaza de Mayo identified. Asheville Global Report, Archives, No. 339, 14–20 July 2005.
 Otra víctima de los vuelos de la muerte (in Spanish) Clarín, 4 December 2005.
 Las cenizas de Azucena, junto a la Pirámide; La fundadora de las Madres (in Spanish) Página/12, 9 December 2005.
 "US Declassified Documents: Argentine Junta Security Forces Killed, Disappeared Activists, Mothers and Nuns", The National Security Archive.
 Azucena Villaflor de Vicenti - Biographical comments and quotes by people who knew her (in Spanish), Diario Mar de Ajo.

1924 births
1977 deaths
Argentine activists
Mothers of the Plaza de Mayo
People from Avellaneda
People killed in the Dirty War
Victims murdered by being dropped out of an aircraft
Women in war in South America
Women in warfare post-1945